Pepper soup is a soup from parts of West Africa, notably Nigeria that is prepared using various meats, chili peppers and calabash nutmeg as primary ingredients. It is a spicy soup that has a light, watery texture. The name is a misnomer because the soup is not necessarily defined by a pepper-forward flavor profile, that is, the flavors are much more complex, with nutty, bitter, woodsy, and floral notes, as well as warmth.  It is considered to be a delicacy by some people in Western Africa, and some West Africans believe that the soup has some basic medicinal qualities.

Overview
Pepper soup is a common soup in West African cuisine that is prepared using various meats, chili peppers and calabash nutmeg as primary ingredients. Pepper soup is very spicy and goes well with a cold bottle of beer or soft drink. While it is served as an appetizer at official gatherings, pepper soup is more popular at pubs. In Nigeria, it is served at "leisure spots" as a recreational or "feel good" dish. Pepper soup cubes, a pre-mixed blend of spices used in pepper soup, are manufactured by one Nigerian company.

Description
Pepper soup is typically a watery, light soup. There are many variations of the dish in Western Africa. It can be prepared with various meats, such as fish, shrimp, tripe, oxtail, chicken, game, goat, beef or cow hide. It is sometimes prepared using several meats within the pot. Additional ingredients can include tomatoes, onion, green onions, garlic, sweet peppers, ginger, cloves, cinnamon and lime juice. Fufu, a food prepared from boiled and then pounded cassava or other tubers, is sometimes used as an ingredient, which thickens the soup and serves to impart a creamy texture. It is sometimes served with side dishes such as rice or boiled tubers, or served atop these ingredients. On the western coast of Africa, it is typically cooked outdoors in a cauldron.

Pepper soup is considered to be a delicacy among riverine people in Western Africa. It is a popular soup in Nigeria, and in other English-speaking countries in Western Africa including Liberia, Sierra Leone, Gambia and Ghana. Some West Africans believe that pepper soup prepared with chicken has medicinal qualities, and it is served as a remedy to improve the health conditions of ill people. Pepper soup is also sometimes consumed by new mothers, because it is believed by some to assist in the secretion of breast milk. It is also often consumed after wedding celebrations, as a means to restore health.

See also

 Goat meat pepper soup
 List of soups

References

External links
 Nigerian pepper soup
 Nigerian goat meat pepper soup

Nigerian soups
Ghanaian cuisine
Sierra Leonean cuisine
Liberian cuisine
Gambian cuisine
African soups
Chili peppers
National dishes